Cregar is a surname. Notable people with the surname include:

 Bill Cregar (1925–2019), American football player and FBI agent
 Laird Cregar (1913–1944), American actor